Sanford Wheeler (previously known as Matthew Wheeler) (6 April 1970 – 10 March 2020) was an Australian rules football player for the Sydney Swans. He is notable as being the first African-American born player in the history of the AFL and one of few players from the United States to play in the Australian Football League.

Early life 
Matthew Wheeler was born in Lynwood, California to an Australian father and African-American mother. He migrated with his family to Sydney, New South Wales at the age of 5.  As a teenager, he began to take an interest in Australian football and played his junior football for the Parramatta Australian Football Club.

VFL/AFL Career 
Wheeler was recruited by the Sydney Swans as a rookie using their zone allocation at the age of 15. He made his VFL debut to a much depleted Swans team in Round 6 of 1989 against St Kilda. However his first game was not notable and he was dropped for much of the rest of the season. Showing some form in the reserves, Wheeler reappeared in round 20 against Melbourne, with a more satisfactory performance kicking a goal and began to establish himself in the senior side and would make 11 appearances the following season.

The athletic long-haired Wheeler frequently exhibited some dash and flair off the wing and as a rugged rebounding defender off the half back flank.  His quick run and hard tackling were trademarks of his game. However his disposal skills let him down and he had a tendency to get caught holding the ball.

Midway through his career, Wheeler changed his first name by deed poll to "Sanford".

Up to 1993, Wheeler had played 36 games and kicked 6 goals during the Swans' darkest era (he was part of a team that won 3 successive wooden spoons in a financially destitute club between 1992 and 1994 that received the lowest level of support in its history). A highlight was being selected in the New South Wales state team for the 1993 State of Origin Championships. After a serious knee injury and being used sparingly by coach Ron Barassi, he was delisted after the 1994 season as part of a shake up of the Swans list.

Post-AFL 
Wheeler then returned to the United States and became a wealth management advisor for Merrill Lynch Bank of America in Indian Wells.

References

External links

1970 births
2020 deaths
American players of Australian rules football
VFL/AFL players born outside Australia
Sydney Swans players
Australian rules footballers from New South Wales
East Coast Eagles players
American emigrants to Australia
New South Wales Australian rules football State of Origin players
Australian people of African-American descent